Project U.F.O. is an American television series which ran on NBC from 1978 to 1979. Running for two seasons of 13 episodes each, the show was based loosely on the real-life Project Blue Book. The show was created by Jack Webb, who pored through Air Force files looking for episode ideas.

The show was a production of Mark VII Limited in association with Worldvision Enterprises, now CBS Television Distribution and was Webb's last weekly series produced before his death. It was also one of the rare times that Webb did not produce a series with Universal Television or Warner Bros. Television; Webb collaborated with Universal for every series he made following his departure from Warner Bros., who had named him the president of its television division in the 1960s.

Synopsis
The show features two U.S. Air Force investigators with the Foreign Technology Division at Wright-Patterson Air Force Base, charged with investigating UFO sightings. The first season starred William Jordan as Maj. Jake Gatlin alongside Caskey Swaim as Staff Sgt. Harry Fitz. Swaim, who had never had any significant acting experience before landing the role, added diversity as a Southerner with a pronounced accent. In season two, Jordan was replaced by Edward Winter as Capt. Ben Ryan.

In the pilot episode, Gatlin informed the newly assigned Fitz that, since it is impossible to prove a negative, their job was to prove that each UFO sighting was real, by researching and disproving possible alternate explanations. Gatlin also told Fitz that he himself had once seen "something I can't explain" while flying as an Air Force pilot, which led to his interest in Blue Book.

Opening credits 
The season one opening montage showed flying saucer diagrams and schematics, while a minor-key version of "Ezekiel Saw the Wheel" played. A voice-over (narrated by Webb) then spoke:

"Ezekiel saw the wheel. This [UFO diagrams] is the wheel he said he saw. These are Unidentified Flying Objects that people say they are seeing now. Are they proof that we are being visited by civilizations from other stars? Or just what are they? The United States Air Force began an investigation of this high strangeness in a search for the truth. What you are about to see is part of that 20-year search."

The opening narration erroneously cites Project Blue Book as lasting 20 years, rather than only 17 as was the actual case (1952-1969). Notable was the extensive use of miniatures for the UFOs by Brick Price Movie Miniatures (now Wonderworks), usually cobbled together from off-the-shelf model kits.

Broadcast history

Episodes

Season 1: 1978

Season 2: 1978–79

Disclaimer

Placed at the tail end of the ending credits of a majority of the episodes is this disclaimer, superimposed over the official seal of Department of the Air Force:
"The United States Air Force, after twenty-two years of investigations, concluded that none of the unidentified flying objects reported and evaluated posed a threat to our national security."

Rights issues
Except for runs on the United Kingdom's Sci-Fi channel and the Australian cable network TV1 in the early 1990s and TVLand in the U.S. (which ran 1 episode as part of its Ultimate TV Fan hour), this series had not been aired since its original network run by August 2010. Mark VII had creative control over the series and originally held the copyright, but the rights to this series were uncertain as of August 2010. In Italy, the first season of the series was shown on syndication in different Italian districts (for example Video Firenze for Tuscany), with Tony Fusaro as the dubbing voice of the narrator in the opening credits. This series was also shown on Indian state run television network Doordarshan (DD) around 1985.

References

External links

1970s American anthology television series
1970s American science fiction television series
1978 American television series debuts
1979 American television series endings
NBC original programming
UFO-related television
Television series by Mark VII Limited
Television series by CBS Studios
English-language television shows
Television series based on actual events
Television shows set in Fairfax County, Virginia
Television shows set in Virginia
Television series about the United States Air Force